The Homesteads is an unincorporated community and census-designated place (CDP) in Johnson County, Texas, United States. It was first listed as a CDP prior to the 2020 census.

References 

Populated places in Johnson County, Texas
Census-designated places in Johnson County, Texas
Census-designated places in Texas